In Chinese and Japanese Pure Land Buddhism, the  is the 18th vow that is part of a series of 48 vows that Amitābha made in the Infinite Life Sutra. The Temple of the Primal Vow, Hongan-ji, is located in Kyoto, Japan.

Content
The text of the 18th vow of Amitabha Buddha, according to Infinite Life Sutra, reads:

In the Amitāyurdhyāna Sūtra, Buddha taught Ajātasattu's mother, Queen Videhi, that those who attain birth on the lowest level of the lowest grade are the sentient beings who commit such evils as the five gravest offenses, the ten evil acts and all kinds of immorality, when he is about to die, he may meet a good teacher, who consoles him in various ways, teaching him the wonderful Dharma and urging him to be mindful of the Buddha; but he is too tormented by pain to do so, so the good teacher then advises him to repeat nianfo ten times. Because he calls the Buddha's name, with each repetition, the evil karma which he has committed during eighty kotis of kalpas of Samsara is extinguished.

Use of the term Primal Vow
The Japanese term hongan (本願) is derived originally from the Sanskrit term pūrvapraṇidhāna, meaning "original vow" or "original pronouncement." However, the use of pūrvapraṇidhāna for the 18th vow of Amitābha is not known in Indian Buddhism, which does not treat the 18th vow in any special way. The term pūrvapraṇidhāna typically refers to all the original vows made by a bodhisattva in order to develop bodhicitta and begin striving toward Buddhahood. Regarding Pure Land practice in Indian Buddhism, Hajime Nakamura writes that as described in the Pure Land sūtras from India, buddhānusmṛti or "mindfulness of the Buddha" is the essential practice. Buddhānusmṛti is called nianfo in Chinese and nembutsu in Japanese.

Role in Japanese Buddhism
In Japanese Buddhism, Amitabha Buddha is often associated with devotional practices, and he is regarded as striving to save those beings who are incapable of reaching Enlightenment through their negative karma, by leading them to Enlightenment. The founder of Jōdo-shū, Hōnen, emphasized the importance of the Primal Vow over the efficacy of practices espoused by his contemporaries in Tendai. These same teachings became central to the later Jōdo Shinshū sect as well.

This vow forms the basis of Pure Land Buddhism as well as nianfo/nembutsu. As in the vow, it applied not only to a dying person, but also to an animal, or a ghost wandering or in hell, if he has accumulated enough merits in present or past lives, and willing to go there.

References 

Mahayana sutras
Oaths
Pure Land Buddhism